Wójtowizna  is a settlement (part of locality) of Zielonka Pasłęcka in the administrative district of Gmina Pasłęk, within Elbląg County, Warmian-Masurian Voivodeship, in northern Poland.

References

Villages in Elbląg County